Valley Village is a neighborhood of Louisville, Kentucky west of Dixie Highway (US 31W) and north of Bowen Avenue.

Geography

Neighborhoods in Louisville, Kentucky